Substereo is a rock/art rock band consisting of Chris Angel Walker (lead vocals, piano, guitar), Baptiste Watiez (bass) and Arturo Peroni (guitar).

History

Formation
Substereo came together in 2010, when Chris Angel Walker and Mads Lindquist (guitars) met drummer Kaspar Kjeldsen through a mutual acquaintance at their practice space building. Kaspar Kjeldsen had been playing with another project in the same building at the time, and was asked to join Substereo after he auditioned for the band. After a period where the band had performed with a number of different bass players, Lasse Fernov joined the project until 2017.

Discography

Fuel for the Revolution (2013)

In 2011 the band ran into multi-platinum award winning record producer Dito Godwin at the Copenhagen airport. After having listened to the band's material, Dito offered to produce their debut album. The album Fuel for the Revolution was consequently recorded in 2012 and produced by Dito Godwin at Hansen Studios as well as at Phonstudio in the Region of Southern Denmark. The mastering process took place at Audioplanet in Copenhagen.

Prior to the album's release, Substereo entered into Danmarks Radio - KarriereKanonen competition in 2013, where they were in first place for two consecutive weeks, as the most streamed artist on KarriereKanonen's website, with the Single 'Cry Freedom'.

Fuel for the revolution was released on 15/APR/2013. On the day of its release,  the album reached nr. 11 on the iTunes rock chart (Denmark).

Nowhereland (2016)
In 2016 Substereo released a concept album, which is based on a fictional storybook by the same name, and which is written and illustrated by frontman Chris Angel Walker. Each song on the album is titled after its respective chapter in the book.

Renaissance (2019)
Renaissance is the third studio EP/project by Substereo. The album is attached to a five part stop-motion and water-color animation video series that tells the story of Ben the robot, who escapes a dying Earth while trying to save his adopted family. The story for the series was written by Substereo and Rikke Lindquist. The stop motion videos were made on a zero-dollar budget, where most of the props were made from recycled and repurposed materials. Judith Benke, Rikke Lindquist, Anne Vi Gjevnøe and Bent Seis acted as production assistants.

Awards

References

External links

 

Danish rock music groups
Musical groups established in 2010
Danish art rock groups